This is a list of Swansea City A.F.C. managers and their records from 1912, when the club was founded and their first professional manager appointed, to the present day.

History
The first manager to be appointed to Swansea Town was Walter Whittaker. In the club's first season, Whittaker led Swansea to their first Welsh Cup win.  The club's most recent permanent manager is Russell Martin. Swansea have had forty-five permanent managers (of whom six have been player-managers), and four caretaker managers, one of whom has served twice. Haydn Green is Swansea's longest serving manager, having held the position for 8 years, 123 days spanning World War II. Statistically, Roberto Martínez is Swansea's most successful manager with a 50% winning percentage in all competitive games. As a player-manager, John Toshack guided Swansea City to three promotions in four years, from the Fourth Division to the First Division. Swansea finished the 1981–81 season in sixth place – their highest ever league position. There have been three managers hired on a 'permanent' basis (Kevin Cullis, Jimmy Rimmer and Micky Adams) who had winless records during their brief stints at Swansea that spanned less than four weeks between all three of them, in two separate periods of 1996 and 1997.

List of managers
This list of all managers includes performance records and honours.
P = Matches played; W = Matches won; D = Matches drawn; L = Matches lost

Notes

References

External links
Swansea City Managers List
Soccerbase

Swansea City A.F.C. managers
Swansea City